James A. Goodman (born June 12, 1936) is a former Democratic member of the Pennsylvania House of Representatives.

References

Democratic Party members of the Pennsylvania House of Representatives
1936 births
Living people